Jeremiah George (born January 24, 1992) is a former American football linebacker. He was drafted by the New York Jets in the fifth round of the 2014 NFL Draft. He played college football at Iowa State.

George has also played for the Jacksonville Jaguars, Tampa Bay Buccaneers, Dallas Cowboys, and Indianapolis Colts.

High school career
A native of Clearwater, Florida, George attended Clearwater High School. He recorded over 150 tackles as a senior, was the team’s leading rusher with 512 yards and five touchdowns, and was named the 2009 St. Petersburg Times  Pinellas County Defensive Player of the Year. As a junior, he recorded 94 tackles, 12 for loss, four sacks and an interception for the Tornadoes.

Considered a three-star recruit by Rivals.com, he was rated the 57th best outside linebacker prospect of his class.

College career
George attended Iowa State University where he played for the Iowa State Cyclones football team from 2010 to 2013. As a true freshman in 2010, he played in nine games finishing with four tackles. In 2011, he played in all 13 games, appearing mostly on special teams, he recorded one tackle. In 2012, starting nine games, he finished third on the team with 87 tackles, including four tackles for loss and three pass break-ups. As a senior in 2013, George led the Big-12 in tackles with 133, becoming one of only three Cyclones to do so. He also led the team in tackles for loss (12.0), forced fumbles (3), sacks (3.5) and interceptions (2), and was named a first-team All-Big 12 selection.

Professional career

New York Jets
George was drafted by the New York Jets in the fifth round (154th overall) of the 2014 NFL Draft. He signed a four-year contract on May 15, 2014. He was released on September 1, 2014 and signed to the team's practice squad a day later.

Jacksonville Jaguars
The Jacksonville Jaguars signed George off the Jets' practice squad on September 23, 2014.

He was released on September 5, 2015.

Tampa Bay Buccaneers 
On September 6, 2015, George was claimed off waivers by the Tampa Bay Buccaneers. On August 28, 2016, George was waived by the Buccaneers.

Dallas Cowboys
On September 6, 2016, George was signed to the Dallas Cowboys' practice squad. He signed a reserve/future contract with the Cowboys on January 16, 2017. On May 16, 2017, George was waived by the Cowboys.

Indianapolis Colts
On June 15, 2017, George was signed by the Indianapolis Colts.

On September 10, 2017, George made his Colts debut in the season opener against the Los Angeles Rams. In the game, he recovered a fumble off of a muffed catch by Tavon Austin to set the Colts up on the Rams' side of the field.

On September 1, 2018, George was placed on injured reserve. He was released on September 10, 2018.

References

External links
New York Jets bio
Iowa State Cyclones bio

Living people
1992 births
Sportspeople from Clearwater, Florida
Players of American football from Florida
American football linebackers
Clearwater High School alumni
Iowa State Cyclones football players
New York Jets players
Jacksonville Jaguars players
Tampa Bay Buccaneers players
Dallas Cowboys players
Indianapolis Colts players